Saidpur, aka Saiyidpur, is a village and deh in Talher taluka of Badin District, Sindh. As of 2017, it has a population of 2,433, in 470 households. It is the seat of a tapedar circle, which also includes the villages of Dabgiro, Dhoro Nero, Gono, Kandri, Kotri, and Phoosna.

References 

Populated places in Badin District